Akhundzade is an Azerbaijani surname. Notable people with the surname include:

 Mirza Abu Turab Akhundzade (1817–1910), Azerbaijani theologian and educator
 Nariman Akhundzade (born 2004), Azerbaijani footballer
 Yusif Akhundzade, Azerbaijani military conductor and director

See also
 Akhundzada

Azerbaijani-language surnames